Meringandan is a rural locality in the Toowoomba Region, Queensland, Australia.

Geography 
The town is located on the Darling Downs near Highfields,  NNW of Toowoomba.

It is drained by the meandering Meringandan Creek which also formed the boundary between the Shire of Crows Nest and the Shire of Rosalie and separated it from neighboring Meringandan West

History 
The name Meringandan is a corruption of the aboriginal words, Moorin meaning fire and Gandan meaning clay. Therefore, Meringandan means 'place of fire and clay'.

Following the settling of the Leslie brothers at Toolburra, near Warwick in 1840, Henry Hughes (1816-1882) and Henry Isaac (1816-1862) occupied Gowrie as a sheep run on the upper section of Gowrie Creek in 1841. They later took over the land to the north up to the Great Dividing Range, the Meringandan run, from C W Pitts. Henry Hughes severed the partnership with Henry Isaac in 1850; he moved to Westbrook run and Henry Isaac took over the Gowrie aggregation. Henry then took his brother, Fred Isaac (1820-1865), into partnership with him. Fred had reveled in Australian country life and had quickly become an accomplished bushman and station manager.

In 1854, Fred, who had gone home to England for a visit, married his half-cousin, Caroline Sophia née Sparkes (1835-1913), and then returned to run Gowrie. (Their mothers were half-sisters.) By 1860, Henry Isaac had had enough of the pioneering life, so he sold his share of Gowrie to Fred, and returned to England, where he died shortly afterwards. To help with financing the purchase of Henry's share of Gowrie, Fred entered into a partnership with Ernest de St Jean de Satgé (1834-1901), who was Caroline's second cousin. In 1865, Fred Isaac died, the estate was sold to George King and the debts owing to Henry Isaac and Ernest de St Jean were settled. George King's sons initially continued to manage the property for sheep raising but later also bred horses for the Indian remount trade.

It is local folklore that the first white child born in the Meringandan area was Eliza Hunt, her father being an overseer and stockman on the estate.

The Lands Alienation Act of 1868 meant that the Meringandan portion of Gowrie Station was resumed and thrown open for settlement. Many German farmers emigrated to Queensland in the 1860s, some coming to the Darling Downs. Many families in this district are of German descent.

The German settlers congregated in their little slab church, built in 1870. Later the Church of England, the Congregational Church, and the Church of Christ built Churches.

After being thrown open for selection in 1872, the land was soon occupied. The township grew rapidly. General stores were erected, and hotels were built, "The Criterion"; "Farmers Arms". Blacksmiths were kept busy, and so were the butchers. 

Meringandan State School opened on 24 January 1876. It was built during 1875 by Jack Maag. Isaac John Thomas was appointed the first head teacher of the school,. The enrolment for that year was 80 pupils. It is now within the suburb boundaries of Meringandan West.

A branch railway line was constructed from Toowoomba to Cabarlah, the first train running in September, 1883. As Meringandan had a railway station, the settlers in the Goombungee and Haden areas used it to forward their goods. Most of the farmers did their own carting, but well known carriers were Jack Wieck, Herman Lau, George Klein and Jack Lange. In the early 1900s a line of teams stretching a distance of half a mile, waiting to load or unload at the railway station, was a familiar sight. But the construction of the Haden railway line to Haden in 1910 reduced the need to use Meringandan's railway station; meanwhile the use of motor transport was increasing. Following the closure of the railway yards, the railway station was replaced with a park.St Gregory's Anglican Church was consecrated on Sunday 12 September 1886 by Bishop William Webber. It was located on a  piece of land near the railway station, donated by Mr Foland. In 1905 it was relocated to Kingsthorpe where it was re-consecrated as St Gregory's by Archbishop St Clair Donaldson on 20 October 1905. It closed circa 1982.

On Sunday 2 February 1896 a new Lutheran church opened replacing the previous one that had become dilapidated over its quarter century of use. The new church was built by L. Goebel and Son of Gomoran. Inside there was an elevated cedar pulpit.

At the beginning of the 1900s, the Court House was moved from Cabarlah and erected at Meringandan. 

Before 1900, the farmers' wives baked their own bread, but early in the century a bakery was established by O. Wuersching, the first baker employed being Walls.

Brigalow Park Provisional School opened on 17 October 1910. On 1 May 1912 it became Brigalow Park State School. It  closed on 13 April 1962.

Education 
There are no schools in Meringandan.

Amenities 
Meringandan has a country pub, convenience store and a butcher.  

There are two parks. 

Library services in Meringandan are provided by the Toowoomba Regional Council's mobile library service. The van visits Meringandan State School and Meringandan Produce Store every Thursday.

Events 
It has an annual rodeo which many people attend.

Attractions 
It is the gateway to Cooby Dam.

References

External links
 University of Queensland: Queensland Places: Meringandan

Towns in Queensland
Towns in the Darling Downs
1868 establishments in Australia
Populated places established in 1868
Toowoomba Region
Localities in Queensland